Maksim Leonidovich Malakhovskiy (born 28 February 1984) is a Russian professional football coach and a former player. He is an assistant coach with FC Akron Tolyatti.

Club career
He made his Russian Football National League debut for FC Dynamo Saint Petersburg on 1 July 2002 in a game against FC Lada Tolyatti.

External links
 

1984 births
Living people
Russian footballers
Association football forwards
Association football midfielders
FC Lada-Tolyatti players
FC Fakel Voronezh players
FC Ufa players
FC Dynamo Saint Petersburg players
FC Novokuznetsk players
FC Zenit-Izhevsk players
FC Lukhovitsy players
FC Akron Tolyatti players